Feminist ethics is an approach to ethics that builds on the belief that traditionally ethical theorizing has undervalued and/or underappreciated women's moral experience, which is largely male-dominated, and it therefore chooses to reimagine ethics through a holistic feminist approach to transform it.

Concept
Feminist philosophers critique traditional ethics as pre-eminently focusing on men's perspective with little regard for women's viewpoints. Caring and the moral issues of private life and family responsibilities were traditionally regarded as trivial matters. Generally, women are portrayed as ethically immature and shallow in comparison to men. Traditional ethics prizes masculine cultural traits like "independence, autonomy, intellect, will, wariness, hierarchy, domination, culture, transcendence, product, asceticism, war, and death," and gives less weight to culturally feminine traits like "interdependence, community, connection, sharing, emotion, body, trust, absence of hierarchy, nature, immanence, process, joy, peace, and life." Should women embody or use any traditionally masculine cultural traits they are seen as other or as an attempt to be more like men. Traditional ethics has a "male" orientated convention in which moral reasoning is viewed through a framework of rules, rights, universality, and impartiality and becomes the standard of a society. The "female" approaches to moral reasoning emphasizes relationships, responsibilities, particularity, and partiality.

Historical background
Feminist ethics developed from Mary Wollstonecraft's 'Vindication of the Rights of Women' published in 1792. With the new ideas from the Enlightenment, individual feminists being able to travel more than ever before, generating more opportunities for the exchange of ideas and advancement of women's rights. With new social movements like Romanticism there developed unprecedented optimistic outlook on human capacity and destiny. This optimism was reflected in John Stuart Mill's essay The Subjection of Women (1869). Feminist approaches to ethics, were further developed around this period by other notable people like Catherine Beecher, Charlotte Perkins Gilman, Lucretia Mott and Elizabeth Cady Stanton with an emphasis on the gendered nature of morality, specifically related to 'women's morality'.

Charlotte Perkins Gilman
The American writer and sociologist Charlotte Perkins Gilman imagined a fictional "Herland". In this male-free society, women produce their daughters through parthenogenesis and live a superior morality. This women-centered society valued both industriousness and motherhood while discouraged individualistic competitive approaches to life. Gilman thought that in such a scenario women could relate cooperatively as there would be no requirement to dominate each other. Herland cultivates and combines the best "feminine" virtues and the best "masculine" virtues together as co-extensive with human virtue. If a society  wants to be virtuous, according to Gilman, it should exemplify the fictional utopia of Herland. However so long as women are dependent on men for economic support, women will continue to be known for their servility and men for their arrogance. Women need to be men's economic equals before they can develop truly human moral virtue, this is a perfect blend of pride and humility that we call self-respect.

Feminist care ethics

Carol Gilligan and Nel Noddings are exponents of a feminist care ethics which criticize traditional ethics as deficient to the degree they lack, disregard, trivialize or attack women's cultural values and virtues. In the 20th-century feminist ethicists developed a variety of care focused feminist approaches to ethics in comparison to non-feminist care-focused approaches to ethics, feminist ones tend to appreciate the impact of gender issues more fully. Feminist care-focused ethicists note the tendencies of patriarchal societies not to appreciate the value and benefits of women's ways of loving, thinking, working and writing and tend to view females as subordinate. This is why some social studies make a conscious effort to adopt feminist ethics, rather than just the traditional ethics of studies. An example of this was Roffee and Waling's 2016 study into microaggressions against the LGBTIQ community. Even though it was focused on the LGBTIQ community the feminist ethics were better suited, as they are more considerate to the vulnerabilities and needs of the participants. Medical fields also fail to recognize that ethics plays an often negative part in the LGBTIQ community in how they receive treatment and what treatments are given as options to them. As well as how women are also treated within medical fields.

Feminist matrixial ethics
The 'metafeminist' theory of  the matrixial gaze and the matrixial time-space, coined and developed by artist, philosopher and psychoanalyst Bracha L. Ettinger since 1985, articulates a revolutionary philosophical approach that, in "daring to approach", to use Griselda Pollock's description of Ettinger's ethical turn, "the prenatal with the pre-maternal encounter", violence toward women at war, and the Shoah, has philosophically established the rights of each female subject over her own reproductive body, and offered a language to relate to human experiences which escape the phallic domain. Ettingerian matrixial sphere is both a matricial space of encounter in archaic corporeality and a symbolic ethical and aesthetical field - feminnine/maternal and prenatal/prematernal conceptual-psychoanalytical field with a psychic and symbolic dimension that the 'phallic' language and regulations cannot control. Thus, Ettinger offers a language to talk on the female rights over her reproductive body while revolutionizing philosophy and psychoanalysis through matrixiality where feminine sexuality and symbolic responsibility coexist. In Ettinger's model, the relations between self and other are of neither assimilation nor rejection but 'coemergence'. Feminine sexuality is not foreclosed when maternality emerges, matrixial desire is a mixture of both, thus the contradiction between them established by Sigmund Freud and Jacques Lacan) recedes. The feminine is not an absolute alterity (the alterity established by Jacques Lacan and Emmanuel Levinas) and we are offered a language to rethink the archaic mother and the source of humainised life. With the 'originary response-ability', 'wit(h)nessing', 'borderlinking', 'communicaring', 'com-passion', 'seduction into life' and other processes invested by affects that occur in the Ettingerian matrixial time-space, (each process of transformation is named 'metramorphose') the feminine is presented as the source of humanized Ethics in all genders and enters all subjectivities. What Ettinger named 'seduction into life' occurs earlier than the primary seduction which passes through  enigmatic signals from the maternal sexuality according to Jean Laplanche, since it is active in 'coemergence' in 'withnessing' for any born subject, earlier to its birth. Ettinger suggests to Emanuel Levinas in their conversations in 1991, that the feminine understood via the matrixial perspective is the heart and the source of Ethics. At the beginning of life, an originary 'fascinance' felt by the infant is related to the passage from response-ability to responsibility, from com-passion to compassion, and from wit(h)nessing to witnessing operated and transmitted by the m/Other. The 'differentiation in jointness' that is at the heart of the matrixial borderspace has deep implications in the relational field and for the ethics of care. The matrixial theory that proposes new ways to rethink sexual difference through the fluidity of boundaries informs aesthetics and ethics of compassion, carrying and non-abandonment in 'subjectivity as encounter-event'. It has become significant in transgender studies.

Feminist justice ethics

Feminist justice ethics is a feminist view on morality which seeks to engage with, and ultimately transform, traditional universal approaches to ethics.  Like most types of feminist ethics, feminist justice ethics looks at how gender is left out of mainstream ethical considerations.  Mainstream ethics are argued to be male-oriented.  However, feminist justice ethics does differ considerably from other feminist ethics.  A universal set of ethics is a significant part of feminist justice ethics  but depending on the geographical location, such as the difference between the Global North and Global South, may differ in how justice is applied and may change what is considered justice. Feminist justice ethics is clear in dividing "thick" morality from "thin" morality.  Other ethical approaches that define themselves by differentiating groups from one another through culture or other phenomena are regarded as "thick" accounts of morality.  Feminist justice ethics claims that "thick" accounts of morality, as opposed to "thin" accounts of morality, are intrinsically prone to eroding valid feminist critique.

Feminist ethics and the future
Feminist ethicists believe there is an obligation for women's differing points of view to be heard and then to fashion an inclusive consensus view from them. To attempt to achieve this and to push towards gender equality with men together is the goal of feminist ethics. The fixing of these issues are important in modern times because of the shifting view points as well as what has considered to be 'ethical' in terms of treatment and how women, in particular, women's bodies should be treated.

"The goal of feminist ethics is the transformation of societies and situations where women are harmed through violence, subordination and exclusion. When such injustices are evident now and in the future, radical feminist activists will continue their work of protest and action following careful appraisal and reflection" With violence, it once again circles back to masculine behavior and traditional ethics that such behavior and treatment was encouraged. In today's society, the twentieth century, it is becoming less socially acceptable to commit violence against women.

Feminist ethics and International Relations 

Feminist theories and that of ethics broaden the scope of the predominantly masculine sphere of International Relations. This is especially important for issues of the private realm to take stage into the public which includes issues such as children's rights, gender violence and discrimination, gender relations in war torn societies, and other similar issues which remain difficult to appear relevant in the mainstream discussions of ethics in international relations. The feminist dialogues of ethics are almost inescapably present to the private realm and are known to only shadow dominant 'male' paradigms of ethics in the public realm. This is especially a reality in discussion of ethics in International Relations where it is predominantly built on a language of violence, technologies or economics and what are known to be the masculine topics of discussion.

See Kimberly Hutchings discussion in "Ethics" for further detail on the foundations of the theory in International Relations

Selection of Authors and applied theory  in International Relations 

Alison Watson 

Watson discusses the issue of children born of wartime rape and uses feminist theory of ethics in addressing these marginalized issues. The invisibility is emphasized in the traditional construction within much of the existing international discourse of motherhood as a 'private sphere activity'   where important focused issues such as children of wartime rape can be lost in translation of international dialogue and minimally touched upon. Feminist theory of ethics is provided in terms of broadening theoretical dialogues of international relations and addressing issues that remain marginalized.

Puechguirbal 

There is evidence that failure to broaden the current scope of ethics in peacekeeping operations and rebuilding strategies, surrounding arms and violence, results in failing to meet the needs of both men and women. Puechguirbal argues that conflict is a 'gendered experience' and discusses the importance of peacekeeping operations keeping in check the differential impacts of war on women, men, boys and girls in post conflict society so as to not further marginalize the most vulnerable groups of the population Currently, peacekeeping operations are heavily masculine in the sense that security revolves around the cessation of hostilities and disarmament. Peacebuilding operations must shift the focus from solely disarming and cessation of hostilities against gang members to social constructions of violence against women, men, and children that is embedded in societies broken apart by conflict. Gender issues have not been part of mandates of peacekeeping missions and  urges women to take a more active role in political processes in post-conflict reconstruction. Applying Feminist ethics in peacekeeping and re-building strategies can reach a wider range of issues as well as deemed not of dire importance in dialogues of International Relations. Current strategies are not reaching target goals of generating peace and cessation of   gender violence and sexual abuses that continue to reach high levels in incidences. This remains a residue of post-conflict societies that must be addressed. Implementing feminist ethics generates greater peacekeeping and peacebuilding strategies for gendered strategies to meet the needs of both genders so as to be implemented into not only the institutions but society.

See also

References

Further reading
 Abel, Emily K. and Margaret K. Nelson, (eds.), (1990). Circles of Care: Work and Identity in Women's Lives, Albany: SUNY Press.
 Armbruster, H. Feminist Theories and Anthropology
 Barker, Drucilla K. and Susan F. Feiner. Liberating Economics: Feminist Perspectives on Families, Work, and Globalization. University of Michigan Press, 2004.
 
 Beasley, Chris. (1999). What is Feminism?: An Introduction to Feminist Theory, London: Sage Publications.
 Beecher, C.E. and Stowe, H.B. (1971). The American Woman's Home: Principle of Domestic Science, New York: Aeno Press and The New York Times.
Pembroke Center for Teaching and Research on Women, Brown University
Feminist Theory Papers, Brown University
 Brownmiller, S.(1993). Against Our Will: Men, Women, and Rape, New York: Fawcett Columbine.
 Buhle, M.J., Buhle, P. (eds.) (1978). The Concise History of Women's Suffrage, Urbana: University of Illinois Press.
 
 Butler, Judith. (1990). Gender Trouble: Feminism and the Subversion of Identity, New Your: Routledge.
 . (1999). On Feminist Ethics and Politics, Lawrence, KS: University Press of Kansas.
 Chodorow, N. (1999). The Reproduction of Mothering: Psychoanalysis and the Sociology of Gender, updated edition, Berkeley: University of California Press.
 Confessore, N.and D. Hakim. (2009). "Paterson picks Gillibrand for Senate seat". NYTimes.com, January 23.
 Copjec, Joan. (2002). Imagine There's No Woman: Ethics and Sublimation, Cambridge, Massachusetts: MIT Press.
 Daly, M. (1984). Pure Lust: Elemental Feminist Philosophy, Boston: Beacon Press.
 Donovan, Josephine. (2003). Feminist Theory: The Intellectual Traditions, 3rd ed., New York: Continuum..
 Donovan, Josephine and Carol Adams. (2007). Feminist Care Tradition in Animal Ethics: A Reader, New York: Columbia University Press, 1-20.
The Feminist eZine- 1001 Feminist Links and Other Interesting Topics
 Ettinger, Bracha L. (2006). The Matrixial Borderspace. Univ. of Minnesota Press.
 Ettinger, Bracha L. (2020). Matrixial Subjectivity, Aesthetics, Ethics. Pelgrave Macmillan. 
 Friedan, B. (1997). Feminist Mystique, New York: W.W. Norton & Company.
 Friedan, B. (1998). The Second Stage, Cambridge, Massachusetts: Harvard University Press.
 Frye. M. (1991). "A response to Lesbian Ethics: Why ethics?" In C. Card (ed.), Feminist Ethics, Lawrence, Kans.: University Press of Kansas, 52–59.
 Gilligan, C. and D.A.J. Richards (2008). The Deepening Darkness: Patriarchy, Resistance, and Democracy's Future, Cambridge, Massachusetts: Harvard University Press.
Gilligan's stages of moral development
Halberstam, J, 1994, “F2M: The making of female masculinity”, in The lesbian postmodern, Laura Doan (ed.), New York: Columbia University Press, 210–28.
 Hanigsberg, Julia E. and Sara Ruddick, (eds.), (1999). Mother Troubles: Rethinking Contemporary Maternal Dilemmas, Boston: Beacon Press.
 Held, V. (1993). Feminist Morality: Transforming Culture, Society, and Politics, Chicago: University of Chicago Press.
 Held, V. (ed.), (1995). Justice and Care: Essential Readings in Feminist Ethics, Boulder, CO: Westview Press.
 
 Heywood, Leslie and Jennifer Drake, (eds.), (1997). Third Wave Agenda: Being Feminist, Doing Feminism, Minneapolis: University of Minnesota Press.
 Larry Hinman's Ethics Updates  Himan, L. Ethics Updates, University of San Diego.
 Hoagland, S.L. (1988). Lesbian Ethics, Palo Alto, Calif.: Institute of Lesbian Studies.
 Howard, Judith A. and Carolyn Allen. (2000). Feminisms at a Millennium, Chicago: The University of Chicago Press.
 Hypatia, a Journal of Feminist Philosophy, Simpson center for the humanities, University of washington.
 Jaggar, A.M. (1994). Living with Contradictions: Controversies in Feminist Social Ethics, Boulder, CO: Westview Press.
 King, Y.(1995). "Engendering a peaceful planet: ecology, economy, and ecofeminism in contemporary context".Women's Studies Quarterly, 23: 15–25.
 Kittay, E. F. and E.K. Feder (2003). The Subject of Care: Feminist Perspectives on Dependency, Lanham, MD: Rowman & Littlefield.
 Kolmar, W and Bartowski, F., "Lexicon of Debates". Feminist Theory: A Reader. 2nd Ed, New York: McGraw-Hill, 2005. 42–60.
 Lindemann, Hilde, Marian Verkerk, and Margaret Urban Walker.(2009). Naturalized Bioethics: Toward Responsible Knowing and Practice, Cambridge, Massachusetts: Cambridge University Press.
 Maher, K.(2008). "Campaign '08: Obama puts spotlight on women's pay gap". The Wall Street Journal, September 25: A15.
 Mero, J. (2008). "The myths or catching-up development". In M. Mies and V. Shiva(eds.), Ecofeminism, Chicago: University of Chicago Press. 125: 55–69.
 Mies, M. and Shiva, N. (1993). "Fortune 500 women CEOs". In Fortune.
 Mitchell, J. and S.K. Mishra (2000). Psychoanalysis and Feminism: A Radical Reassessment of Freudian Psychoanalysis, New York: Basic Books.
n.paradoxa: international feminist art journal: feminist theory and contemporary women artists
 Narayan, U. (1997). Decentering the center: Philosophy for a Multicultural, Postcolonial, and Feminist World, Bloomington, IN: Indiana University Press.
 Narayan, U. and S. Harding(2000). The Subject of Care: Feminist Perspectives on Dependency, Lanham, MD: Rowman & Littlefield.
 Noddings, N. (2002). Starting at Home: Caring and Social Policy, Berkeley, CA.: University of California Press.
 Nussbaum, Martha. (1999). "The Feminist Critique of Liberalism". In A. Jeffries (ed.), Women's Voices, Women's Rights: Oxford Amnesty Lectures, The Oxford Amnesty Lecture Series. Boulder, CO: Westview Press.
 Nussbaum, Martha. (2003). "Capabilities and Functional Entitlements: Sen and Social Justice". Feminist Economics, 9 (2-3): 33–59.
 The Radical Women Manifesto: Socialist Feminist Theory, Program and Organizational Structure (Seattle: Red Letter Press, 2001)
 Robinson, F. (1999). Globalizing Care: Toward a Politics of Peace, Boston, MA: Beacon Press.
 
 Sterba, James P., (ed.), (2000). Ethics: Classical Western Texts in Feminist and Multicultural Perspectives, New York: Oxford University Press.
 The Third Wave Foundation
 Tong, R. and Williams N., Stanford Encyclopedia of Philosophy, Feminist Ethics, First published Tue May 12, 1998; substantive revision Mon May 4, 2009.
 Tong, R.  (2009). Feminist Thought: A More Comprehensive Introduction, 3rd edition, Boulder, CO: Westview Press.
UN Women, 'Women, Poverty, and Economics- Facts and Figures'
 Virginia Tech, Feminist theory website Center for Digital Discourse and Culture
 Walker, Margaret Urban. (2007). Moral Understandings: A Feminist Study in Ethics, 2nd ed. New York: Oxford University Press.
 Warren, K.J. (2000). Ecofeminist Philosophy: A Western Perspective on What It Is and Why It Matters, Lanham, Md: Rowman & Littlefield.
 Wollstonecraft, M. (1988). A Vindication of the Rights of Women, M. Brody (ed.), London: Penguin.
 Ziarek, Ewa Plonowska. (2001). An Ethics of Dissensus: Postmodernity, Feminism, and the Politics of Radical Democracy, Stanford, CA: Stanford University Press.

 
Applied ethics
Black feminism
Gender equality
Egalitarianism
Equality rights
Feminism
Feminism and society
Feminist movement
Feminist philosophy
Human sciences
Identity politics
Multicultural feminism
Postmodernism
Professional ethics
Relational ethics
Rights
Social ethics
Social inequality
Womanism
Women's rights